Gbangbatoke Airport   is an airport serving Gbangbatoke in Sierra Leone.

See also
Transport in Sierra Leone

References

External links
 Great Circle Mapper - Gbangbatok

Airports in Sierra Leone